Rhabdops olivaceus, the olive trapezoid snake or olive forest snake, is a snake endemic to the Western Ghats of India. Following the description of populations in Goa, northernmost Karnataka, and southern Maharashtra as a new species, Rhabdops aquaticus, the known range of Rhabdops olivaceus is from Parambikulam Tiger Reserve in Kerala north to Kottigehara in Karnataka, and possibly slightly further.

This species is found in damp steamsides within rainforests and is distributed from Palghat in Kerala to the Malanad area of Karnataka. It is a docile, placid snake and is said to be semiaquatic, feeding on small, soft-bodied animals. In habits, it is more frequently seen during the rains, both day or night.

References

olivaceus
Snakes of Asia
Reptiles of India
Endemic fauna of the Western Ghats
Reptiles described in 1863
Taxa named by Richard Henry Beddome